There have been two baronetcies created for persons with the surname Barry, one in the Baronetage of Ireland and one in the Baronetage of the United Kingdom.

The Barry baronetcy, of the City of Dublin, was created in the Baronetage of Ireland on 1 August 1775 for the prominent Irish physician Edward Barry. The title descended from father to son until the death of his grandson, the third Baronet. The late Baronet died unmarried and was succeeded by his younger brother, the fourth Baronet. He also died unmarried and was succeeded by his first cousin, the fifth Baronet. He was the son of Reverend John Barry, younger son of the first Baronet. Three of his sons succeeded to the title. The baronetcy became either extinct or dormant on the death of the youngest son, the eighth Baronet, in circa 1895.

The Barry Baronetcy, of St Leonard's Hill in Clewer in the County of Berkshire and Keiss Castle in the County of Caithness, was created in the Baronetage of the United Kingdom on 22 February 1899 for the businessman and Conservative politician Francis Barry. His great wealth derived from business interests in Portugal, including the Sao Domingos Mine in the Alentejo. He had already been created Baron de Barry by King Luís I of Portugal in 1876. He represented Windsor in the House of Commons from 1890 to 1906 and was a great benefactor to the town.  He was succeeded by his second but eldest surviving son, the second Baronet. He was a Lieutenant-Colonel in the Berkshire Yeomanry and also served as high sheriff and vice lord-lieutenant for Berkshire. As of 2007 the title is held by his great-grandson (the title having descended from father to son), the fifth baronet, who succeeded in 1977.

Barry baronets, of the City of Dublin (1775)

Sir Edward Barry, 1st Baronet (1698–1776)
Sir Nathaniel Barry, 2nd Baronet (–1785)
Sir Edward Barry, 3rd Baronet (–)
Sir Walter Barry, 4th Baronet (died )
Sir Edward Barry, 5th Baronet (died 1836)
Sir Edward Barry, 6th Baronet (died )
Sir John Barry, 7th Baronet (died 1891)
Sir James Barry, 8th Baronet (died )

Barry baronets, of St Leonard's Hill and Keiss Castle (1899)

Sir Francis Tress Barry, 1st Baronet (1825–1907)
Sir Edward Arthur Barry, 2nd Baronet (1858–1949)
Sir Claude Francis Barry, 3rd Baronet (1883–1970)
Sir Rupert Rodney Francis Tress Barry, 4th Baronet (1910–1977)
Sir Lawrence Edward Anthony Tress Barry, 5th Baronet (born 1939)

External links
Short biography of Sir Francis Barry, 1st Baronet

References

Baronetcies in the Baronetage of Ireland
Extinct baronetcies in the Baronetage of Ireland
Baronetcies in the Baronetage of the United Kingdom